Zarza de Tajo is a municipality in located in the province of Cuenca, Castile-La Mancha, Spain. It has a population of 254.

References 

Municipalities in the Province of Cuenca